Euscarthmus is a genus of South American birds in the tyrant flycatcher family Tyrannidae.

Species
The genus contains 3 species:

References

 
Bird genera
Taxonomy articles created by Polbot